The Moreau envelope (or the Moreau-Yosida regularization)  of a proper lower semi-continuous convex function  is a smoothed version of . It was proposed by Jean-Jacques Moreau in 1965.

Definition 

Properties 

 The proximal operator of a function is related to the gradient of the Moreau envelope by the following identity:
. By defining the sequence  and using the above identity, we can interpret the proximal operator as a gradient descent algorithm over the Moreau envelope.

 By Hopf-Lax formula, the Moreau envelope is a viscosity solution to a Hamilton-Jacobi equation. Stanley Osher and co-authors used this property and Cole-Hopf transformation to derive an algorithm to compute approximations to the proximal operator of a function.

See also 

 Proximal operator
 Proximal gradient method

References

External links 

 
 A Hamilton-Jacobi-based Proximal Operator: a YouTube video explaining an algorithm to approximate the proximal operator

Mathematical optimization